Locked Up, originally known as Vis a Vis, is a Spanish serial drama television series produced by Globomedia, initially for Spanish Network Antena 3 and later for Fox Spain. It premiered on 20 April 2015. The series focuses on Macarena Ferreiro, who is sent to prison for fiscal offenses and goes on to depict prison life and the corruption of law-enforcement bodies.

One year after Antena 3 cancelled the show, Fox Spain announced they had picked up the series for a third season, which premiered on 23 April 2018. It became the most watched paid TV in its timeslot. A fourth and final series premiered on 3 December 2018. Netflix also bought global streaming rights for the show.

Following the show's initial cancellation, several cast members moved on to other projects, resulting in major cast changes in seasons 3 and 4. Production also moved to a different filming location, as the previous studio became the set of another Álex Pina show, Money Heist. Maggie Civantos, who played the series' main character in the first two seasons, had her role reduced due to her commitment to another show, Cable Girls. Najwa Nimri, Berta Vázquez, María Isabel Díaz Lago, Marta Aledo, Laura Buena and Alba Flores returned as main cast members.

A spin-off entitled Vis a vis: El oasis was released in 2020, and focuses on Macarena and Zulema, and is the last installment of the series.

Plot 
Macarena Ferreiro Molina is a Spanish woman who falls in love with her boss and commits embezzlement. She is accused of four tax crimes and consequently imprisoned at the Cruz del Sur Prison as a precautionary measure with a high bail set.

In prison, Macarena learns that to avoid projected seven-year sentence she will likely receive if convicted depends on changing, evolving and becoming a different person. To pay the bail, her family outside searches for a large sum of money hidden somewhere.

Series overview

Season 1 (2015) 

Framed by her lover for corporate fraud, young Macarena Ferreiro finds herself locked up in a high security women's prison surrounded by tough, ruthless criminals.

Still in denial, prison proves to be a very rude awakening for Macarena and at the end of her first day, she finds herself struggling to cope. Yolanda, her cell mate, takes Macarena under her wing, but a midnight visit from Zulema, the prison's most dangerous inmate, is about to change Macarena's life forever.

Season 2 (2016) 

Zulema, Saray and Macarena escape from prison. With Sandoval's (Ramiro Blas) bribery, Miranda (Cristina Plazas) imposes stricter prison rules and regulations in response to their escape. With authority from the director to use any extreme measures to discipline misbehaving inmates, some officials abuse their power on some of the inmates.

Season 3 (2018) 

Saray, Rizos, Sole (María Isabel Díaz Lago), Tere (Marta Aledo), Anabel (Inma Cuevas), Antonia (Laura Baena) and Zulema (Najwa Nimri) adapt to the new environment of Cruz del Norte after being transferred to the new prison.

Season 4 (2018–2019) 

Season four deals with the aftermath of Zulema (Najwa Nimri), Saray (Alba Flores) and Altagracia's (Adriana Paz) escape. Altagracia, who used to terrorize the woman inmates as a prison guard, is now one of them. Sandoval is the new director of Cruz del Norte.

Cast and characters 
While the show initially focused on the character of Macarena Ferreiro, portrayed by Maggie Civantos, it became an ensemble show.

Cruz del Sur female inmates 
Maggie Civantos as Macarena Ferreiro: A young woman sentenced to prison for seven years due to embezzlement. (season 1–2, Oasis; Recurring: season 3–4).
Najwa Nimri as Zulema Zahir: Known as the queen of prison due to her criminal records and illegal activities even while incarcerated. (season 1–4, Oasis).
Berta Vázquez as Estefania "Rizos" Kabila: A young prisoner in prison for four years due for auto theft. (season 1–4).
Alba Flores as Saray Vargas de Jesús: A young woman sentenced  for assault. (season 1–4, Guest: Oasis).
Inma Cuevas as Ana Belén "Anabel" Vila Roig Garcés: A woman sentenced to 9 years for prostitution and drugs. (season 1,2 and 3).
María Isabel Díaz Lago as Soledad Núñez Hurtado: A prisoner who burned her husband and mistress to death. (seasons 1–4).
Laura Baena as Antonia Trujillo Díez: The prison cook, must serve 5 years.
Belén Cuesta as Yolanda Montero

Cruz del Sur employees 
Roberto Enríquez as Fabio Martínez León: A hot-tempered prison guard and former police officer. (season 1–2, Guest: 3).
Ramiro Blas as Carlos Sandoval Castro: The prison doctor of Cruz del Sur and director of Cruz del Norte. (season 1–2,4, Guest: 3, Oasis). 
Cristina Plazas as Miranda Aguirre Senén: The director of Cruz Del Sur. (season 1–2).
 Alberto Velasco as Antonio Palacios Lloret: A friendly prison guard.(season 1–2,4).
 Harlys Becerra as Ismael Valbuena Ugarte: An antagonistic chief prison guard. (season 1–2).
Ana Labordeta as Paloma Garrido "Governor": The head prison guard. (Recurring season 1).

Macarena's family 
Carlos Hipólito as Leopoldo Ferreiro Lobo: Macarena's father and former police guard. (season 1–2).
 as Encarna Molina: Macarena's mother. (season 1–2).
Daniel Ortiz as Román Ferreiro Molina: Macarena's older brother. (season 1–2, Guest: Oasis).

Cruz del Norte inmates 
Ruth Díaz as Mercedes Carrillo –A mother and a politician in the local district that was sentenced to prison due to corruption. (season 3; guest: 4).
  as Akame: Leader of the Chinese gang in Cruz del Norte and antagonistic towards the newly transferred inmates from Cruz del Sur. (season 3).
Ana Marzoa as Prudencia Mosqueira: Soledad's friend in prison. (season 3).
Itziar Castro as Goya Fernández: One of the self-proclaimed leaders of Cruz del Norte and a drug dealer. (season 3–4, Oasis).
Abril Zamora as Luna Garrido –A transgender inmate who befriended the Cruz del Sur inmates, also a drug addict. (season 3–4).

Cruz del Norte employees 
Javier Lara as Álex Moncada: Director of Cruz del Norte. (season 3).
 Luis Callejo as Andrés Frutos: A prison guard who secretly trades with the Chinese inmates. (season 3).
 Adriana Paz as Altagracia Guerrero: An ex-prisoner and an antagonistic prison guard, Zulema's accomplice. (season 3–4).
 Cristina Marcos as Magdalena Cruz: Owner of Cruz del Sur, del Norte, del Oeste, and the newly planned del Este. (season 4).
 Benjamín Vicuña as Antonio Hierro: A strict prison guard assigned to monitor Zulema. (season 4).
Zaira Pérez as Nuria Millán: Prison guard in Cruz del Norte. (Recurring season 3–4).

Police 
Jesús Castejón as Inspector Damián Castillo: The head detective of the police force. (season 1–4, Guest: Oasis).
Hugo Guzmán as Camilo Jalapeño: Inspector Castillo's partner. (Recurring season 2).
Verónika Moral as Helena Martín: An undercover cop in prison.(season 2).
Jose Javier Domínguez as Inspector Pipiolo: Inspector Castillo's partner. (Recurring season 2).
Irene Anula as Inspector Nerea Rojas: Inspector Castillo's partner, Rizos' love interest. (Recurring season 3).

Cast summary 

  = Lead character
  = Macarena Ferreio's relatives
  = Inmates
  = Prison staff
  = Police inspectors
  = Oasis Characters

International broadcast 
Season 1 started broadcasting in the United Kingdom on 17 May 2016 on Channel 4's Walter Presents video-on-demand service. In 2017, Prime Video acquired the first two seasons for the United States, and in 2018, Hulu acquired the first four seasons for Japan. In Greece, the series premiered on 27 November 2018 on ERT. Netflix bought the rights for international distribution in 2017.

The series is also available for a limited amount of time on the online streaming service 'VTMGO' by the Belgian broadcaster VTM.

Reception

Critical response 
Critics praised the cast's acting and fast-paced storyline. "The acting is strong throughout, the characters engaging and believable, the script is fast-paced and captivating, and it looks beautiful on screen with some creative and imaginative camerawork." Rebecca Nicholson from The Guardian says that the show is "tremendously silly and fantastically taut thriller that carries itself at a breathless pace".

"This is violent – brutally so – and very graphic in its portrayal of life in a women's prison. But utterly brilliant at the same time. It is dark with a constant air of threat and menace running through it. I love it." from Martin Howse of Entertainment Focus.

Awards and nominations

Spin-off 
A spin-off series titled Vis a vis: El Oasis premiered in April 2020. The show focuses on Macarena and Zulema teaming up together. The spin-off serves as the last season for the series.

References

External links 
 
 
 Locked Up at Rotten Tomatoes

2015 Spanish television series debuts
2019 Spanish television series endings
2010s prison television series
2010s Spanish drama television series
Lesbian-related television shows
Serial drama television series
Spanish crime television series
Spanish prison television series
Spanish thriller television series
Television shows set in Spain
Antena 3 (Spanish TV channel) network series
Spanish-language television shows
Television series by Globomedia